Knop or Knope is a surname of Dutch and German origin.

Notable people
 Adolf Knop (1828–1893), German geologist and mineralologist
 Carsten Knop (born 1969), German journalist
 Guenter Knop (born 1954), German photographer
 Ian Knop, Australian businessman
 Leslie Knope, a character on Parks and Recreation
 Oscar Knop (1896–1952), American football player
 Petr Knop (born 1994), Czech cross country skier
 Steven Knope, American internist
 Wilhelm Knop (1817–1891), German agrochemist

Knop, other uses:
 Knop's solution, standardized plant nutrient solution developed in 1865 by Wilhelm Knop at Leipzig University

See also
 Knob (disambiguation)
 Knopf (disambiguation)
 Kjell Knops (born 1987), Dutch footballer
 Raymond Knops (born 1971), Dutch politician

References

Dutch-language surnames
German-language surnames